The Genting Sempah Tunnel is the first highway tunnel in Malaysia. Located on the Kuala Lumpur–Karak Expressway, the 900-metre tunnel connects Hulu Gombak in Selangor to Genting Sempah, Pahang. This tunnel was constructed between 1977 and 1979. The tunnel was officially opened in 1979 by the former Minister of Works and Communications, Abdul Ghani Gilong.

The tunnel was once used to be the longest road tunnel in Malaysia before the construction of the 4-km SMART Tunnel which was opened in 2007.

Originally, the Genting Sempah Tunnel was used to be a 2-lane single-carriageway tunnel but then an additional tunnel for the eastbound traffic was constructed between 1995 and 1997 when the Karak Expressway was upgraded from a 2-lane highway to a high-speed multi-lane expressway.

See also
 Transport in Malaysia

References
 Adopted from Terowong jalan raya paling panjang - Buku Rekod Malaysia Edisi Kedua, Ghulam Jie M Khan

Road tunnels in Malaysia
Tunnels completed in 1979